Dráusio Luis Salla Gil (born 21 August 1991) is a Brazilian footballer who plays centre back.

Football career
Throughout his career, Gil has proven his ability to use both feet equally well.

On the 2016-17 season, Draúsio play for Catania.

On 22 August 2017, Draúsio signed three years contract with Marítimo.

References

External links
 

Living people
1991 births
Brazilian footballers
Brazilian expatriate footballers
Association football midfielders
Bonsucesso Futebol Clube players
Paulista Futebol Clube players
Club Athletico Paranaense players
Joinville Esporte Clube players
Red Bull Brasil players
Catania S.S.D. players
C.S. Marítimo players
Campeonato Brasileiro Série A players
Primeira Liga players
Expatriate footballers in Italy
Expatriate footballers in Portugal
Association football defenders
Sportspeople from Campinas